Scaif is a polishing wheel infused with a mixture of olive oil and diamond dust used in the diamond cutting industry. It was invented in 1456 by Lodewyk van Bercken. 

With the scaif, it became possible to polish all the facets of the diamond symmetrically at angles that reflected the light best. This invention revolutionized the diamond cutting industry and correspondingly, much increased the popularity of diamonds.

The scaif consists of a hard disk, parallel to the floor. The disk looks like and is rotated in the same way as a potter's wheel. On the top surface a film of olive oil and diamond dust is placed. Surrounding the disk is a circular frame to catch the oil that is spun off as the disk is rotated. 

Hovering just above the surface of the disk is a mechanical arm to hold the diamond. It can be finely adjusted, to move the diamond into the exact position needed for polishing the facets. As the facets are polished more diamond dust is produced, replenishing the supply.

External links
The Diamond Invention. Chapter 11 by Edward Jay Epstein
Diamond cutting. Thank you, Lodewyk van Berken by Jeffrey Blancq. April 21, 2006 

Diamond cutting
Cutting tools
Belgian inventions
Jewellery making